The 1965–66 Boston Bruins season was the Bruins' 42nd season in the NHL.

Offseason

Regular season

Final standings

Record vs. opponents

Schedule and results

Playoffs

Player statistics

Regular season
Scoring

Goaltending

Awards and records

Transactions

Draft picks
Boston's draft picks at the 1965 NHL Amateur Draft held at the Queen Elizabeth Hotel in Montreal, Quebec.

Farm teams

See also
1965–66 NHL season

References

External links

Boston Bruins
Boston Bruins
Boston Bruins seasons
Boston Bruins
Boston Bruins
1960s in Boston